Taras Sokolyk is a former political organizer. He played a prominent role in the Progressive Conservative Party of Manitoba's 1995 election campaign, in which the party won a majority government.

Once a political organizer in Manitoba, Canada, he served as chief of staff to Progressive Conservative premier Gary Filmon in the 1990s.

References
Manitoba vote-splitting inquiry ends

Living people
Place of birth missing (living people)
Year of birth missing (living people)
Businesspeople from Manitoba
Progressive Conservative Party of Manitoba politicians
Canadian people of Ukrainian descent